The Parish of San Pascual Baylon and National Shrine of Nuestra Señora Inmaculada Concepcion de Salambao (Tagalog: Parokya ni San Pascual Baylon at Pambansang Dambana ng Nuestra Señora Inmaculada Concepcion de Salambao), also known as Obando Church, is a Roman Catholic church located in the municipality of Obando in the province of Bulacan, Philippines.  Founded by Franciscan missionaries, under the Spanish Empire, it is the venue of the three-day Obando Fertility Rites held annually in honor of three patron saints, namely: St. Pascual Baylon, St. Claire of Assisi and Our Lady of Salambao, a celebration that was mentioned by Jose Rizal, the Philippine national hero, in the pages of his Spanish-language novel, the Noli Me Tangere (in Chapter 6: Captain Tiago).  During the month of May, parishioners and other devotees perform the three-day Obando Dance (formerly known as the Kasilonawan, now locally called Sayaw sa Obando, literally "the dance in Obando") inside the church, followed by a street procession.

Structure
Its façade had been described as similar to that of the church of Marilao, Bulacan. The edifice is composed of windows and flat columns and has a pediment with a niche and two round windows at the sides.  The façade is also flanked by an octagonal belltower.  Connected to its structure is the Colegio de San Pascual Baylon, a private school managed by the parish.  The altar of the church is believed to be gilded with silver.

History
The Obando Church was built by the Franciscan Order, headed by Rev. P. Manuel de Olivencia, the first curate of Obando, on April 29, 1754.  The church was destroyed in World War II during the fight for the liberation from the Japanese rule. According to some reports, the original statues of Our Lady of Salambao, Saint Clare and Saint Paschal Baylon were also destroyed during the fighting, and that the images presently venerated are commissioned replication of the original images.  The church was rebuilt in 1947 through the efforts of Rev. Fr. Marcos C. Punzal with the help of local Obandeño parishioners.

Other parish priests who also managed the Obando Church since the 1900s include: Rev. Fr. Juan Dilag, Rev. Fr. Padre Exequiel Morelos, Rev. Fr. Ricardo Pulido, Rev. Fr. Marcos Punzal, Rev Msgr. Rome R. Fernandez, Rev. Fr. Marcelo K. Sanchez, Rev. Fr. Danilo G. delos Reyes, Rev. Fr. Avelino A. Sampana, and Rev. Fr. Virgilio C. Ramos. It was Rev. Fr. Rome Fernandez, with the assistance from the Cultural Commission of Obando, who revived the celebration of the Obando Fertility Rites or the Obando Dance in 1972.  This was after a prohibition of the practice was imposed by an archbishop of Manila after World War II.

Current status
The Church of Obando has been declared as the "Diocesan Shrine" of the Our Lady of the Immaculate Concepcion of Salambao by the Catholic Church on December 1, 2007.

The church is connected to several barangay chapels in Obando, Bulacan, namely Panghulo, Catanghalan, Pag-asa, Paliwas, San Pascual, and Hulo.  Two former chapels that now have parochial church statuses: the Santa Cruz Parish in Paco and the Parish of Our Lady of Salambao in Binuangan. Both are still within the political boundaries of present-day town of Obando.

On January 27, 2021, Obando Church was elevated to the rank of National Shrine by the Catholic Bishops' Conference of the Philippines, raising the number of national shrines in the country to 27.

The parish church was solemnly declared a National Shrine on March 25, 2022, during a mass presided by Manila Archbishop Jose Advincula.

At present, Obando Church is managed by its parish priest, Rev. Fr. Proceso Espiritu, since his installation in 2021.

Gallery

See also
Obando Fertility Rites
Colegio de San Pascual Baylon

References

External links

Philippines Obando Church Interior, Obando, Bulacan, ca. early 1900s, old photograph inside the Obando Church, at Teleguam.net
Shrine of the Lady of Salambao, Obando Church's Nave, at Flickr.com
Inside the Obando Church, at YouTube.com

Roman Catholic churches in Bulacan
Spanish Colonial architecture in the Philippines
Roman Catholic churches completed in 1754
18th-century Roman Catholic church buildings in the Philippines
1754 establishments in the Philippines
Roman Catholic national shrines in the Philippines
Churches in the Roman Catholic Diocese of Malolos